British Steel Limited is a long steel products business founded in 2016 with assets acquired from Tata Steel Europe by Greybull Capital, then acquired by Jingye Group in 2020.  The primary steel production site is Scunthorpe Steelworks, with rolling facilities at Skinningrove Steelworks, Teesside.

History

In 2014 the long products division employed approximately 6,500 workers and was operating with 2.8 million tonne p.a. capacity. The division included primary production at Scunthorpe steelworks, mills in Teesside (Teesside beam mill, Skinningrove and Darlington special profiles), France (Hayange rail mill) and Scotland (Dalzell and Clydebridge), along with other assets, now sold Immingham Bulk Terminal. In late 2014 estimates for the value of the property was approximately $1.4 billion. Talks during August 2015 on the acquisition ended unsuccessfully, with Klesch citing energy prices and (dumping of) Chinese steel imports as factors against the sale. The Scottish facilities were mothballed in late 2015, and then sold to Liberty House Group in 2016.

In late 2015 a preliminary agreement was made with Greybull Capital for the sale of the long products division. The sale was agreed to on 11 April 2016 for a nominal £1, with Greybull taking over the assets and liabilities of the division. At takeover the division employed approximately 5,000 workers, predominately in the UK. The sale was completed at the end of May 2016, with the resulting business renamed British Steel. As part of the takeover, new agreements were made with workers and unions, including a wage cut, end to bonus schemes, and the end of a final salary pension scheme. The British Steel Pension Scheme (BSPS) was not included in the sale. Thanks to a restructuring effort led by Bimlendra Jha (then Executive Chairman of Longs Steel U.K.) Greybull stated that at acquisition the business was profitable.

In June 2017, it was reported that the previously loss-making plant at Scunthorpe was once again back in profit, a year after Greybull took the concern over from Tata Steel. The 2015-2016 financial year saw a loss of £79 million, while 2016-2017 produced a profit of £47 million before tax. In light of this, British Steel Limited announced that the 3% pay cut agreed to by the workers on takeover, would be reversed.

Insolvency
On 22 May 2019, British Steel was placed into an insolvency process, putting 5,000 jobs in the UK at risk and endangering 20,000 in the supply chain. The move followed a breakdown in rescue talks between the government and the company's owner, Greybull. The Government's Official Receiver took control of the company as part of the insolvency process. Accountancy firm EY took on the role of Special Manager and is attempting to find a buyer for the business. Theresa May announced to parliament that HM Treasury had "agreed an indemnity for the official receiver to enable British Steel to continue to operate in the immediate future". The Guardian also reported in the same article that "The number of people employed in UK steel manufacturing has fallen by 300,000 since 1971", from 310,000 to around 10,000 in 2019.

In August 2019, Oyak, a Turkish army pension fund announced that it planned to take over British Steel by the end of 2019 however talks stalled.

In November 2019, Jingye Group, a Chinese TVE, agreed in principle to buy British Steel for £70 million. The take-over was completed in March 2020.

In August 2020, UK-based Liberty Steel acquired the former Sogerail plant in Havange, France.

Operations

At creation in 2016, the business consisted of:
 Scunthorpe Steelworks, England – primary blast furnace based production – bloom, billet, sections, slab, rail and wire rod and is the largest steel factory in the UK
 Teesside Steelworks, England (Teesside Beam Mill) - heavy sections
 Skinningrove Steelworks, England – special sections and crane rail
 Former Sogerail plant, Hayange, France  – railway rails
 An engineering workshop in Workington

Notes

References

British companies established in 2016
Companies based in Scunthorpe
Steel companies of the United Kingdom
2016 establishments in England
2019 mergers and acquisitions